The School for Poetic Computation (SFPC) is a hybrid of a school, residency and research group that was founded in 2013 in New York. A small group of students and faculty work closely to explore the intersections of code, art, hardware and theory—focusing especially on artistic intervention, including code poetry. Rather than formal classes, the students at the school focus on creative projects. The school's motto is "more poems, less demos." 

The school was co-founded by Zachary Lieberman, Taeyoon Choi, Amit Pitaru, and Jen Lowe. In the summer of 2020, amidst discussions about how the administrators had handled issues related to Black Lives Matter, the school transitioned to a more collective organization. Lieberman publicly stepped down, and the other members of the former administration team wrote a post that was published from Choi's Medium account. SFPC is now run by the "SFPC Stewards," who are committed to running a "beautiful school" centering BIPOC, disabled, and queer makers.

References

External links 
 
 Official SFPC blog
 New York Times article about School for Poetic Computation

Computer art
New media art
Mass media technology
Art schools in New York City
Arts organizations based in New York City
Arts organizations established in 2013
2013 establishments in New York (state)